Ranunculus anemoneus, commonly known as the anemone buttercup, is an endangered species of buttercup found in alpine Australia.

References

anemoneus
Flora of New South Wales
Plants described in 1855
Taxa named by Ferdinand von Mueller